Elections to Durham County Council took place on 1 May 2008, along with other local elections in the UK. This was the first election to the unitary authority established as part of the 2009 changes to local government, and all seats were up for election using the first past the post voting system. The election saw the council double in size to 126 councillors, with 63 electoral divisions each returning two members.

Labour kept control of the council with 67 seats. The Liberal Democrats were second with 27 seats and the Conservatives won 10. There were also 22 independents elected.

Results

|-
! style="background-color:#ffffff; width: 3px;" |  
| style="width: 130px" |Derwentside Independents
| align="right" | 10
| align="right" | N/A
| align="right" | N/A
| align="right" | N/A
| align="right" | 7.9%
| align="right" | 6.2%
| align="right" | 16,385
| align="right" | N/A
|-

|-
! style="background-color:#ffffff; width: 3px;" |  
| style="width: 130px" |Durham Taxpayers Alliance
| align="right" | 0
| align="right" | N/A
| align="right" | N/A
| align="right" | N/A
| align="right" | 0.0%
| align="right" | 0.0%
| align="right" | 111
| align="right" | N/A
|-
|}

Results by electoral division

Chester-le-Street (14 seats)

Derwentside (22 seats)

Durham (22 seats)

Easington (24 seats)

Sedgefield (22 seats)

Teesdale (6 seats)

Wear Valley (16 seats)

References

2008 English local elections
2008
2000s in County Durham